Aghin kayaran is a village in the Shirak Province of Armenia.

Demographics
The population of the village since 1926 is as follows:

References 

Populated places in Shirak Province